York Factory First Nation—sometimes referred to as York Landing First Nation or York Factory Cree Nation—is a First Nations community in northern Manitoba, Canada.

Its main reserve is York Landing, which is located along the eastern bank of the Nelson River, roughly halfway between Lake Winnipeg and Hudson Bay, as well as located 116 kilometres from Thompson, Manitoba.

As of 2016, the York Landing reserve has a population of 443 and it consists of 138 dwellings. It is served by the York Landing Airport.

History
The Swampy Cree (Maškēkowak / nēhinawak) peoples of York Factory, Manitoba, were relocated to York Landing after the Hudson's Bay Company's York Factory location closed in 1957.

In 1986, the Government of Canada transferred  of reserve lands at York Landing to the First Nation.

York Landing received official reserve status in 1989.

Demographics

York Factory First Nation had a registered population of 1,239, with 456 members living on the 967.40 hectares reserve of York Landing. It is governed by a chief and four councillors.

References

Keewatin Tribal Council
First Nations governments in Manitoba
First Nations in Northern Region, Manitoba
Cree governments